Akin Düzakin (born 12 May 1961) is a Turkish-Norwegian illustrator and children's author.

Düzakin has illustrated a wide range of children's books, including books about Tvillingbror and Tvillingsøster of Liv Marie Austrem for which he received the Brage Prize in 1995 and 1997. He also won the Unni Sands bildebokpris award in 1998. Furthermore, in 2006 he won the Bokkunstprisen award. 

Düzakin is known for acrylic paintings with poetic, naive motifs and clear shapes.

External links 
Official website

References

1961 births
Living people
Norwegian children's writers
Norwegian publishers (people)
Turkish emigrants to Norway
Norwegian people of Turkish descent